The Thomas Saf-T-Liner is the name of the transit-style (Type D) school bus product line produced by Thomas Built Buses. Introduced in 1978, the Saf-T-Liner marked the transition to in-house chassis production by Thomas. In addition to school bus applications, variations of the Saf-T-Liner have been produced as activity buses, specialty vehicles, and commercial/transit buses. It can also be used to describe the Saf-T-Liner C2 or Saf-T-Liner FS-65, but they are not considered part of the Saf-T-Liner family.

Currently, all versions of the Saf-T-Liner model line are produced in High Point, North Carolina.

Design history
Prior to its reorganization as Thomas Built Buses in 1972, Thomas Car Works produced both front and rear-engined transit-style school buses to compete with other manufacturers. As was the common practice during the era, production of the chassis was outsourced to another manufacturer. Thomas offered its transit-style buses on a wide variety of chassis in comparison to other manufacturers (changing between Dodge, Ford, GMC, International Harvester, and Volvo). In contrast, Blue Bird, then the largest school bus manufacturer in the United States, manufactured its own chassis (as did West Coast manufacturer Gillig).

In 1978, coinciding with an updated body design necessitated by federal school bus safety regulations, Thomas became a chassis manufacturer with the launch of the Saf-T-Liner EF and ER (EF=Engine Front, ER=Engine Rear). For the first time, the Saf-T-Liner was produced on a Thomas-designed chassis.

Current models

Saf-T-Liner HDX

In 2001, Thomas introduced its current generation of rear-engine bus with the debut of the Thomas Saf-T-Liner HD (HD=Heavy Duty); for 2004, the HD was re-branded as the HDX.

Serving as the replacement for the Saf-T-Liner ER and WestCoastER, the HD/HDX would use much of the same body, with the exception of the drivers' compartment forward.  On the outside, the front roofcap was completely redesigned, fairing in the front warning lights; the "School Bus" lettering was changed to a reflective decal.  In a move to increase visibility, the windshield was enlarged and reconfigured to a 2-piece curved configuration.  A distinguishing feature of the redesign would be the design of the sideview mirrors.  To improve forward sightlines, all three sets of sideview mirrors (flat, convex, and blind-spot crossview) were integrated into single roof-mounted units, eliminating a number of brackets.

Several parts of the redesign reflected the acquisition of Thomas by Freightliner.  While the chassis remained a Thomas-produced unit, parts of the body were sourced from Freightliner, including the headlights (from the Century Class) and instrument panel (from the Business Class M2 and Sterling trucks).  In a further move to improve visibility, the instrument panel was centrally-mounted.  Other changes were intended for the HD/HDX to accommodate a wide variety of bus drivers. The HD/HDX includes a fully adjustable driver's seat, a tilt/telescoping steering column, and an optional adjustable pedal cluster.

Saf-T-Liner EFX

In the fall of 2011, the Thomas Saf-T-Liner EF was given its most extensive redesign since 1991. As part of the redesign, it was re-branded the EFX, bringing its naming in line with the rear-engine HDX model. The EFX and the HDX also share the same roof cap design; a large 2-piece curved windshield replaced the 4-pane flat glass unit used previously. Aside from the front grille, the EFX is also distinguished by its use of separate crossview mirrors instead of the integrated units seen on the HDX. Inside, the interior is sourced from the 2010 update of the EF; the gauge cluster (sourced from Freightliner) is now offset towards the center of the bus.

Discontinued models

Saf-T-Liner EF

Introduced in 1978, this model underwent minor redesigns during the 1980s that reduced its chrome trim. In 1984, it received rectangular headlights. However, as lower-cost front-engine transits came onto the market in the late 1980s and early 1990s, this model was gradually replaced by the All Star EF and the Saf-T-Liner MVP EF. Today, the Saf-T-Liner EF name lives on as the MVP-series EF lost its prefix in 2007.

Saf-T-Liner MVP

Standing for Maneuverability, Visibility, and Protection, the MVP series of the Saf-T-Liner represented their first substantial update. Introduced as new series for 1991, the MVP represented Thomas's entry into lower-cost Type D school buses, a segment created by the Blue Bird TC/2000 and Wayne Lifestar. From the outside, the MVP EF and ER had much larger windshields, and updated drivers compartments. To distinguish them from the Saf-T-Liner ER, the MVP series had dual headlights instead of quad headlights. In 2004, the MVP ER was discontinued as Thomas replaced it and the Saf-T-Liner HD with the HDX. The MVP EF, with minor updates in 2007 and 2010, was produced until it was replaced by the EFX in 2011.

Saf-T-Liner ER

Introduced in 1978, the ER was produced through the 1980s with relatively few detail changes. In 1984, the headlights and front turn signals were switched from round to rectangular units. In 1991, the driver's compartment was redesigned, with a much larger windshield. During the late 1990s, this model was distinguished from MVP-series ERs by its optional black plastic headlight trim.

WestCoastER

Shortly after the introduction of the Saf-T-Liner ER, this variant was introduced by Thomas for West Coast markets (primarily California and Washington State). To better compete with the Crown Supercoaches and Gillig Transit Coaches that had long dominated West Coast school bus sales, Thomas upgraded the Saf-T-Liner ER with heavier-duty components; this upgrade was not made to the EF. Additionally, on 90-passenger models, a second rear axle was an option. As it was a regionally focused model, the WestCoastER did not sell in large numbers. However, as Crown Coach and Gillig both exited the school bus industry in the early 1990s, Thomas gained significant ground on the West Coast.

Current model specifications
Both current models of the Saf-T-Liner are available with diesel engines (or optional natural gas engine in the HDX), and have a maximum seating capacity of 90 passengers.

Discontinued model specifications
The discontinued models of the Saf-T-Liner were available with diesel engines (or optional natural gas engine in the ER), and have a maximum seating capacity of 90 passengers.

Commercial use 

 Alongside the Saf-T-Liner C2, the EFX and HDX are also produced for commercial applications; Thomas uses the Transit Liner name for its commercial model lines.  The replacements for the TL960 and Transit Liner MVP, the Transit Liner EFX/HDX share much of their bodies with the Saf-T-Liner, differing in their windows and seating.

See also 

 Blue Bird All American
 Blue Bird TC/2000
 IC Bus RE-series 
 Wayne Lifestar

References

External links

 Saf-T-Liner HDX website
 Thomas Built Buses

School buses
Thomas Built Buses